Jason Marcano (30 December 1983 – 30 May 2019) was a Trinidad and Tobago international footballer who played as a forward.

Personal life
Marcano was born to parents Maria John and Steve Marcano, the only boy with five sisters. He started his football career at the age of 10 while attending arima west government primary school, he later went on to play for the under 20 team and the Trinidad and Tobago under 23 Olympic team in 2003.

Marcano lived in his home town of Arima with his wife and son. He was a cousin of professional footballer Elton John, with whom he played at San Juan Jabloteh and Central.

Death
On 30 May 2019, Marcano was driving along Trinidad's Eastern Main Road near Arouca when he lost control of his vehicle and crashed into a wall, killing him.

Honours
San Juan Jabloteh
TT Pro League: 2008
Trinidad and Tobago FA Trophy: 2010–11

Central
TT Pro League: 2014–15, 2015–16, 2016–17
Trinidad and Tobago Goal Shield: 2014
CFU Club Championship: 2015, 2016
Trinidad and Tobago Charity Shield: 2015
Trinidad and Tobago Pro Bowl: 2015
Trinidad and Tobago League Cup: 2018

Individual
TT Pro League Youth MVP: 2005

References

External links
Soca Warriors profile

1983 births
2019 deaths
Road incident deaths in Trinidad and Tobago
Association football forwards
Trinidad and Tobago footballers
People from Arima
W Connection F.C. players
San Juan Jabloteh F.C. players
St. Ann's Rangers F.C. players
Central F.C. players
TT Pro League players
Trinidad and Tobago international footballers